Liviu is a Romanian given name deriving from Latin 'Livius'. Liviu may refer to:

Constantin-Liviu Cepoi (born 1969), Romanian-Moldovan luger
Dorin Liviu Zaharia (1944–1987), Romanian pop musician
Liviu Aron (born 1980), neuroscientist and geneticist at Harvard University in Boston, USA.
Liviu Burlea (born 1981), Moldovan-Romanian musician, composer, music producer and photographer
Liviu Cangeopol (born 1954), Romanian writer, journalist, and political dissident
Liviu Ciobotariu (born 1971), Romanian football defender
Liviu Ciulei (born 1923), Romanian theater and film director, actor and architect
Liviu Comes (1918–2004), Romanian composer and musicologist
Liviu Constantinescu (1914–1997), Romanian geophysicist and professor
Liviu Cornel Babeș (1942–1989), Romanian who committed suicide as a political protest
Liviu Dragnea (born 1961), Romanian politician
Liviu Floricel, Romanian football player
Liviu Floda (1913–1997), Romanian-American journalist and commentator.
Liviu Ganea (born 1988), Romanian football (soccer) striker
Liviu Hapaină (born 1978), Romanian football player
 (born 1984), Romanian DJ and singer
Liviu Librescu (1930–2007), Romanian born and educated Israeli-American scientist
Liviu Mancas, former Romanian tennis player
Liviu Marinescu (born 1970), Romanian composer of orchestral and chamber music
Liviu Mihai (born 1977), Romanian professional football player
Liviu Naghi (1929–1989), Romanian basketball player
Liviu Negoiță (born 1962), Romanian politician and lawyer
Liviu Negoiță (born 1977), Romanian footballer
Liviu Rebreanu (1885–1944), Romanian novelist, playwright, and journalist
 (born 1992), Romanian singer
Liviu-Dieter Nisipeanu (born 1976), Romanian chess grandmaster

Romanian masculine given names